George Jonathan Danforth was a member of the South Dakota Senate.

Biography
Danforth was born on November 21, 1875 in Meeme, Wisconsin. He attended the University of Wisconsin-Oshkosh and the University of Wisconsin-Madison. In 1903, he moved to Sioux Falls, South Dakota. On August 21, 1907, Danforth married Nora I. Tollefson. Danforth died on March 30, 1952. He was a Congregationalist.

Career
Danforth was a member of the Senate from 1919 to 1922. Previously, he had been State's Attorney of Minnehaha County, South Dakota. In 1930 and 1938, Danforth was a candidate in the Republican primary for the United States Senate. He lost to incumbent William H. McMaster in 1930 and to John Chandler Gurney in 1938.

References

People from Meeme, Wisconsin
Politicians from Sioux Falls, South Dakota
Republican Party South Dakota state senators
South Dakota lawyers
University of Wisconsin–Oshkosh alumni
University of Wisconsin–Madison alumni
1875 births
1952 deaths